The São Romédio Community is an historic neighbourhood in Caxias do Sul, Brazil.

History

The community was founded in mid-1876 during the Italian colonization of the Rio Grande do Sul. (Some immigrants had already arrived at Caxias do Sul before 1876.) The majority of immigrants came from Sanzeno, Trentino.

Its church,  named for Saint Romedius, was an early point of reference for the settlers, and is still a point of aggregation and historical and cultural heritage of the Rio Grande do Sul.

In 2016, the community celebrated the 140th anniversary of its founding and the local press gave great importance to the event, acknowledging its history.

Gallery

See also 

 History of Caxias do Sul

References

External links

Culture in Rio Grande do Sul
Caxias do Sul
Populated places established in 1876
1876 establishments in Brazil